Liffey is a rural locality and town in the local government areas of Meander Valley and Northern Midlands in the Launceston and Central regions of Tasmania. The 2016 census has a population of 155 for the state suburb of Liffey.
It was named by Captain William Moriarty, from Ireland. The town is situated in rainforest, on the Liffey River at the foot of the Great Western Tiers. Nearby towns are Bracknell and Blackwood Creek.

The most notable attraction in the area is Liffey Falls.

History
Liffey was gazetted as a locality in 1968.
Liffey Post Office opened on 16 August 1887 and closed in 1973.

Geography
The Liffey River flows through from south-west to north-east.

Road infrastructure
Highland Lakes Road (A5) follows much of the western boundary, and passes through the south-west corner. Route C513 (Liffey Road / Gulf Road) enters from the north-east and runs west along the Liffey River to the Lower Liffey Falls carpark.

References

Localities of Meander Valley Council
Localities of Northern Midlands Council
Towns in Tasmania